Zhu Changfang, also known as the Jingyi Taoist (1608–1646) was the last Prince of Lu (an area claimed by one source as being near Hangzhou and by another as being centered on Weihui in Henan). Zhu Changfang was a member of the Imperial family of the Southern Ming during the Ming-Qing transition. He was also an artist.

In 1646, the Qing armies captured Zhu Changfang along with Zhu Yousong and executed them at the Caishikou Execution Grounds, bringing an end to the Ming dynasty imperial line.

Biography

Zhu Changfang was the son of Zhu Yiliu and the grandson of the Longqing Emperor. He inherited the title Prince of Lu from his father in 1618. The mausoleum incorporated several unorthodox elements, including a separate grave for his father's concubine, a greater number of guards than normal, and novel animal sculptures.

When Zhang Xianzhong and Li Zicheng rebelled against the Chongzhen Emperor, Zhu applied to the throne for permission to undertake military action against the rebels. However his campaign was unsuccessful and he was forced to flee to Hangzhou. After the Chongzhen Emperor's suicide in 1644, Zhu was petitioned by his advisors Shi Kefa and Gao Hongtu to assume the throne in exile, however it was his relative Zhu Yousong who eventually took the throne as the Hongguang Emperor. 

He was executed in 1646 in Beijing, after surrendering to the Qing dynasty along with a number of other Southern Ming princes.

Works

Zhu Changfang practiced of calligraphy and traditional Chinese painting. He was also a musician who performed on the guqin. He made (or oversaw the making of) over 300 guqin, created a new type of guqin incorporating Western design elements, and developed a guqin musical style he termed the "Central Harmony". He also wrote a treatise on the instrument, the Guyin Zhengzong, in 1634, as well as a book on Chinese chess. Zhu also wrote a number of biographies of imperial personages.

Zhu's calligraphy has been overlooked after his death. His calligraphy was patterned after that of Wang Xizhi, and he produced calligraphic and artistic works in several styles. He was responsible for inscriptions at the City God Temple at Weihui and the Western Great Temple in Zhonghe, as well as many other inscriptions and scrolls, but after his execution his work was largely overlooked, to the extent that one of his bronze inscriptions was listed in a Qing catalogue of antiquaries as being from the Zhou dynasty (which ended over 1800 years before Zhu's birth).

See also
Eight Views of Xiaoxiang

External links
Recent cover by John Thompson of Zhu Changfang's big hit Pingsha Luo Yan ("Wild Geese Descend on a Sandbank")
More on "Wild Geese Descend on a Sandbank"

References

1608 births
1646 deaths
17th-century Chinese monarchs
People executed by the Qing dynasty
Ming dynasty Taoists
Ming dynasty calligraphers
Musicians from Shanxi
Guqin players
Ming dynasty imperial princes
Artists from Shanxi
Politicians from Changzhi
Ming dynasty politicians
Executed people from Shanxi
Executed Qing dynasty people
17th-century Chinese calligraphers
Executed royalty
17th-century Chinese musicians